Trismelasmos dejongi is a moth in the family Cossidae.  It is found on the Moluccas.

References

Zeuzerinae
Moths described in 2001